Gölköy is a village in the Hamamözü District, Amasya Province, Turkey. Its population is 389 (2021).

References

Villages in Hamamözü District